Robert Rosenthal may refer to:

 Robert Rosenthal (psychologist) (born 1933), German-born social psychologist
 Robert Rosenthal (USAAF officer) (1917–2007), U.S. Air Force pilot during World War II
 Robert W. Rosenthal (1945–2002), American economist
 Robert Rosenthal (businessman) (born 1949), Long Island businessman and wealth management professional
 Robert Jon Rosenthal (born 1948), journalist and newspaper editor